Nsiah is a surname. Notable people with the surname include:

Christian Nsiah (born 1975), Ghanaian sprinter
Gabby Nsiah Nketiah, Ghanaian businessman and politician
Philippe Nsiah (born 1994), French footballer
Vida Nsiah (born 1976), Ghanaian sprinter and hurdler
Nana Owusu-Nsiah, Ghanaian police officer and diplomat